Swindon Town Hall is a former municipal building in Swindon, England which was built in to be a centrepiece of New Swindon. It is currently used by Swindon Dance, a National Dance Agency. It is a Grade II listed building.

History 

The building was commissioned to replace the old town hall in the High Street in the Old Town part of Swindon. By 1890, the New Swindon Local Board had plans to build their new public offices in what is now Regent Circus. This location, halfway between the new Railway Village and the Old Town, was thought by some to be "both psychologically and strategically an excellent position for the new town to establish a landmark building". The site was acquired from Colonel William Vilett Rolleston, owner of the Old Manor House in the Market Square.

Following a design competition for which there were 20 entries, the building was designed by Brightwen Binyon of Ipswich in a Victorian style. The design included a main entrance with a round-headed archway flanked by paired fluted brackets with a balustrade and a 90 ft high clock tower above. It was officially opened by the Marquess of Bath on 21 October 1891.

In the later 19th century the prospect of combining the New Town and the Old Town into a single Swindon had become a burning issue. Commentators of the time such as the Swindon Advertiser's editor William Morris were heavily in favour. The New Swindon Urban District Council was the more powerful of the two at this time, containing within it all of Swindon's industrial companies and the majority of the population. The two towns remained separate until 1901 when they combined and Swindon Borough Council became the last to be incorporated during Queen Victoria's reign.

The town hall in Regent Circus became the council offices of the new Borough and remained so until the Civic offices were opened in Euclid Street in July 1938.

The ground floor of the town hall housed the Swindon Reference Library until 2006 when it moved into temporary accommodation pending new purpose-built premises in Regent Circus becoming available in October 2008. Meanwhile the remainder of the building has been used as dance studios and a media hub.

References

Buildings and structures in Swindon
City and town halls in Wiltshire
Government buildings completed in 1891